Doddington Hall is, from the outside, an Elizabethan prodigy house or mansion complete with walled courtyards and a gabled gatehouse. Inside it was largely updated in the 1760s. It is located in the village of Doddington, to the west of the city of Lincoln in Lincolnshire, England.

History
Doddington Hall was built between 1593 and 1600 by Robert Smythson for Thomas Tailor, who was a lawyer, the Recorder to the Bishop of Lincoln. It is a grade I listed building. The facade is wide, but the house is only a single room deep at the centre.  In the 12th century the manor of Doddington was owned by the Pigot family who sold it to Sir Thomas Burgh in 1450, and eventually to John Savile of Howley Hall in Leeds. In 1593, he sold the manor house to Thomas Tailor who commissioned the present house. It was inherited by his son, and then his granddaughter Elizabeth Anton who married Sir Edward Hussey of Honington in Lincolnshire. Their son Sir Thomas Hussey inherited in 1658. Sir Thomas's three daughters were his co-heiresses when he died in 1706. Mrs Sarah Apreece was the surviving heiress and on her death in 1749, her daughter Rhoda, wife of Captain Francis Blake Delaval (the elder) of Seaton Delaval Hall in Northumberland, inherited. It then passed to her second son, Sir John Hussey-Delaval, and he had improvements made to the Hall in 1761 by Thomas and William Lumby of Lincoln. John's younger brother Edward Delaval inherited in 1808, and his daughter, Mrs Sarah Gunman, who inherited on her father's death in 1814, left the Hall to Lieutenant Colonel George Jarvis in 1829. On his death it passed to his cousin the Rev Robert Eden Cole, and it remains in private ownership today. In the mid 20th century the Hall was restored by Laurence Bond and Francis Johnson.

The hall's contents, including textiles, ceramics, porcelain, furniture and pictures, reflect 400 years of unbroken family occupation.

The hall and gardens are open to the public, with facilities for private tours and school visits. A temple designed by Anthony Jarvis in 1973 stands in the gardens. Summer concerts and occasional exhibitions are held in the Long Gallery. Other businesses have been developed on the estate such as the sale of Christmas trees, weddings, a Cycle shop with cafe and a farm shop selling local produce. Daniel Codd in Haunted Lincolnshire claims the hall is haunted. The hall was featured on an episode of An American Aristocrat's Guide to Great Estates on the Smithsonian Channel and Amazon Prime Video. It first aired in 2020.

The parkland and gardens of Doddington Hall are listed Grade II* on the Register of Historic Parks and Gardens.

The Doddington tapestries
In 1762, Sir John Hussey Delaval covered every inch of the Holly Room – even the back of the doors – with tapestries showing country scenes. The tapestries were made in Flanders in the early 17th century.

Gallery

References

Jenkins, Simon, England's Thousand Best Houses, 2003, Allen Lane,

External links

Country houses in Lincolnshire
Elizabethan architecture
Grade I listed buildings in Lincolnshire
Grade I listed houses
Grade II* listed parks and gardens in Lincolnshire
Historic house museums in Lincolnshire
Houses completed in 1600
North Kesteven District